North Berwick Coastal is one of the six wards used to elect members of the East Lothian Council. It elects three Councillors.

Councillors

Election Results

2017 Election
2017 East Lothian Council election

2012 Election
2012 East Lothian Council election

2007 Election
2007 East Lothian Council election

References

Wards of East Lothian
North Berwick